Montebello (Italian for "Beautiful Mountain") is a city in Los Angeles County, California, United States, located just east of East Los Angeles and southwest of San Gabriel Valley. It is an independent city.  east of downtown Los Angeles. It is considered part of the Gateway Cities, and is a member of the Gateway Cities Council of Governments.

In the early 20th century, Montebello was a well-known source for oil reserves. At the 2020 census, the population estimate was 63,833.

History 

Historic occupants of the land along the Rio Hondo River were the indigenous Tongva (also known as Gabrielino), a portion of the Uto-Aztecan family of Native Americans. The Tongva occupied much of the Los Angeles basin and the southern Channel Islands - Santa Catalina, San Nicolas, San Clemente and Santa Barbara.

When the explorer Juan Rodríguez Cabrillo arrived off the shores of Santa Catalina in 1542, he was met by the Tongva people.  Because the language of the Tongva was different from the neighboring tribes, the Spanish called them "Gabrielino".  As more non-natives arrived and established settlements, diseases that were endemic among them caused high mortality among the Tongva and other indigenous peoples. These were new infectious diseases to them. By 1870, the area had few remaining indigenous inhabitants.

Father Angel Somera and Father Pedro Cambon, both Franciscan missionaries, founded the original Mission San Gabriel Arcángel, called Mission Vieja, on September 8, 1771. Today the site is  near the intersection of San Gabriel Boulevard and the Rio Hondo River.  The establishment of this mission marked the beginning of settlement by Spaniards in the Los Angeles region; it was the fourth of twenty-one  missions that they ultimately established along California's El Camino Real. The mission did well initially as a farm and cattle ranch.

Six years after its founding, however, a destructive flood led the mission fathers to relocate the mission farther north, to its current location in what is the present day city of San Gabriel. The original mission site is California Historical Landmark #161.

During the early years of the mission's operations, the region was managed by Spanish colonists who had a "Rancho" land grant system.  The current city of Montebello consists of land from Rancho San Antonio, Rancho La Merced, and Rancho Paso de Bartolo. The Juan Matias Sanchez Adobe, built in 1844, still stands at the center of old Rancho la Merced in East Montebello. Rancho la Merced is the city's oldest standing structure.

On January 8, 1847, the Battle of Río San Gabriel took place in what are today parts of the cities of Whittier, Pico Rivera and Montebello.  The battle was a decisive, critical victory for the U.S. Army in the Mexican–American War. The United States took control of Los Angeles and Alta California.  Today, the site is noted as California State Historical Landmark #385. Two cannons and a plaque commemorating the battle were installed overlooking the river at Bluff Road and Washington Boulevard.

Following Repetto's death in 1885, his brother sold his rancho to a consortium of five Los Angeles businessmen, including banker Isaias W. Hellman and wholesale grocer/historian Harris Newmark, for $60,000, or approximately $12 per acre. The land was later divided among the partners, one large parcel of approximately  going to a partnership of Newmark and his nephew, banker Kaspare Cohn.

After the partners received the advice of hydraulic engineer William Mulholland for the design and building of the town's water system, they subdivided the land. In 1900 the completed water system was incorporated as the Montebello Land and Water Company.

An area of  adjacent to the tracks of what was formerly the San Pedro, Los Angeles & Salt Lake Railroad was developed into a townsite called Newmark. It was bounded by Los Angeles Avenue on the south, 1st Street on the east, Cleveland Avenue on the north, and 5th Street on the west.  The remainder of the land was subdivided into  lots suitable for small-scale agriculture.  On William Mulholland's suggestion, leaders of the city adopted Montebello as the name in 1920, replacing Newmark.

Originally an agricultural community, the city was known for its prolific production of flowers, berries, fruits, and vegetables.  The first public flower show in 1912 was sponsored by the Montebello Women's Club and held in the Montebello High School auditorium on Whittier Boulevard.  The Montebello – El Carmel (South Montebello) Improvement Association, the predecessor of the Montebello Chamber of Commerce, operated from September 1907 to April 1912, with the purpose "to improve and beautify the community." Some of its early achievements included: paving Whittier Boulevard, having trees planted along the streets, establishing the city's first high school, and having the entire area incorporated as "The City of Montebello".

On October 16, 1920, the city was incorporated.  In honor of Montebello's agricultural roots, the city's official seal contains a red poinsettia in the center. In the first half of the 20th century, much of south Montebello was populated by Japanese-American farmers. During World War II, most were interned hundreds of miles away at camps in harsh areas under direction by President Franklin D. Roosevelt by Executive Order 1066. Many of the displaced residents were unable to return to their homes; survivors and their descendants did not receive an official apology or compensation until the late 20th century. The family of M's Flowers can trace their history and participation in the growth of the flower industry, largely through their efforts.

The Standard Oil Company discovered oil in the Montebello hills in 1917 on the Baldwin and Temple properties; this discovery changed the face of the city. Oil fields replaced agriculture.  Eventually, the oil pumped from this find produced one-eighth of the crude oil in California. Over the course of sixty years, the Montebello hills were filled with producing oil wells.

Geography 
The surrounding cities are Monterey Park, South San Gabriel, and Rosemead to the north, Commerce to the south, Pico Rivera to the east, and Los Angeles and East Los Angeles to the west. It is also sometimes considered part of the Gateway Cities, and the city is a member of the Gateway Cities Council of Governments.

Climate

Demographics

The 2010 United States Census reported that Montebello had a population of 62,500. The racial makeup of Montebello was 33,633 (53.8%) White, 567 (0.9%) African American, 634 (1.0%) Native American, 6,850 (11.0%) Asian, 58 (0.1%) Pacific Islander, 18,431 (29.5%) from other races, and 2,327 (3.7%) from two or more races. Hispanic or Latino of any race were 49,578 persons (79.3%). Non-Hispanic Whites were 8.5% of the population.

Ethnic Latinos, mostly Mexican-American, make up the predominant group of residents in the city. Montebello borders East Los Angeles, and is well known for its Mexican-American history and culture.  Montebello also has a significant Armenian-American community. In the 2010 census, 38.3% of Montebello residents identified as  foreign born, with 75.6% speaking a language other than English in the home.

The census reported that 62,100 people (99.4% of the population) lived in households, 39 (0.1%) lived in non-institutionalized group quarters, and 361 (0.6%) were institutionalized.

There were 19,012 households, of which 8,168 (43.0%) had children under the age of 18 living in them, 9,088 (47.8%) were opposite-sex married couples living together, 4,031 (21.2%) had a female householder with no husband present, 1,651 (8.7%) had a male householder with no wife present.  There were 1,302 (6.8%) unmarried opposite-sex partnerships, and 134 (0.7%) same-sex married couples or partnerships. 3,350 households (17.6%) were made up of individuals, and 1,640 (8.6%) had someone living alone who was 65 years of age or older. The average household size was 3.27.  There were 14,770 families (77.7% of all households); the average family size was 3.67.

The population was spread out, with 16,142 people (25.8%) under the age of 18, 6,414 people (10.3%) aged 18 to 24, 17,567 people (28.1%) aged 25 to 44, 13,857 people (22.2%) aged 45 to 64, and 8,520 people (13.6%) who were 65 years of age or older.  The median age was 34.7 years. For every 100 females, there were 93.3 males.  For every 100 females age 18 and over, there were 89.5 males.

The homeowner vacancy rate was 0.9%; the rental vacancy rate was 4.1%.  29,095 people (46.6% of the population) lived in owner-occupied housing units and 33,005 people (52.8%) lived in rental housing units.

According to the 2010 United States Census, Montebello had a median household income of $47,488, with 15.4% of the population living below the federal poverty line.

2000
As of the 2000 Census, there were 62,150 people, 18,844 households, and 14,867 families residing in the city. The racial makeup of the city was 46.82% White, 0.90% African-American, 1.23% Native American, 11.64% Asian, 0.08% Pacific Islander, 33.85% from other races, and 5.48% from two or more races. Hispanic or Latino of any race were 74.57% of the population, some of which are also included in the census of the white population.

There were 18,844 households, out of which 40.2% had children under the age of 18 living with them, 51.5% were married couples living together, 20.1% had a female head of household and 21.1% were unrelated individuals. 17.1% of all households consisted of a single individual and 8.0% had persons who were 65 years of age or older living alone.  The average household size was 3.28 and the average family size was 3.67.

The 2000 census data counted persons as 28.6% under the age of 18, 10.4% from 18 to 24, 30.3% from 25 to 44, 18.2% from 45 to 64, and 12.4% who were 65 years of age or older.  The median age was 34.32 years. For every 100 females, there were 92.4 males.  For every 100 females age 18 and over, there were 88.3 males.

The median income for a household in the city was $38,805, and the median income for a family was $41,257. Males had a median income of $30,423 versus $26,590 for females. The per capita income for the city was $15,125.  16.3% of residents have a bachelor's degree or higher and 69% of residents have a high school degree.  About 14.2% of families and 13.2% of the population were living below the poverty line, including 24.3% of those under age 18 and 10.7% of those age 65 or over.

Economy

Top employers
According to the City's 2009 Comprehensive Annual Financial Report, the top employers in the city are:

Government 

Montebello utilizes a city council/city administrator form of government. The city council provides political leadership and policy direction. Montebello's current elected City Treasurer is Rafael Gutierrez. and the current elected City Clerk is Irma-Bernal Barajas.  The city administrator works under the direction of the City Council, and functions as the manager of city employees and the department heads. Montebello has six department heads and some oversee more than one division. Previous Mayor Vanessa Delgado resigned from the Montebello City Council on August 13, 2018 so she could be sworn as a California State Senator.

City Council
The City Council is composed of five members elected at large by the citizens of Montebello to serve for four-year overlapping terms. 

Council meetings are held on the second and fourth Wednesday of each month beginning at 5:30 p.m. at Montebello City Hall, Council Chamber, 1600 W. Beverly Blvd., Montebello, CA 90640

The City Council is responsible for appointing residents to several commissions:

 Civil Service
 Culture & Recreation
 Golf
 Planning
 Traffic & Safety
 Youth
 
The Los Angeles County Department of Health Services operates the Whittier Health Center in Whittier, serving Montebello.

The United States Postal Service operates the Montebello Post Office at 145 North 5th Street and the Montebello Hills Post Office at 2547 Via Campo.

Public safety

Law enforcement
Montebello has its own police department consisting of 74 sworn officers, which includes the Chief of Police, two captains, five lieutenants and ten sergeants. The department also employs 24 civilian personnel organized into three divisions: Field Services, Investigative Services, and Support Services.  The Chief of Police is Brad Keller who started his law enforcement career with Montebello in 1991.  Chief Keller is the tenth police chief of Montebello Police Department since 1920.  Augmenting the department are a Reserve Officer Corps, a Police Explorer Program, a Police Chaplain Corps and a civilian "Citizens on Patrol" program. The department provides a variety of services to citizens including Neighborhood Watch, the Citizen's Academy and a child seat loan program. The Crime prevention Bureau provides free security inspections to local businesses and residents.

Fire department
The Montebello Fire Department is divided into five divisions: Fire Administration, Operations, Communications, Fire Prevention, and Emergency Preparedness. Fire Chief Dominic Hebert oversees the Montebello Fire Department. The Fire Administration division has control over the fire department's functions ranging from the budget to policy and personnel.  The operations division oversees emergency response teams including emergency medical services, fire and rescue, and special operation groups such as Urban Search and Rescue and water rescue. The Operations Division is composed of response personnel from three fire stations, staffing three paramedic engine companies, and one truck company.  The shift Battalion Chief oversees the activities of the three fire stations on their respective shift. The communications division oversees communications for all city operations including fire and police dispatch. The Fire Prevention Division oversees fire and safety inspections, including maintenance of fire protection systems and equipment, and fire and building code enforcement for all public buildings, as well as businesses within the city of Montebello. Fire prevention is also responsible for fire and arson investigation. The Emergency Preparedness Division is responsible for the coordination and training of public safety employees in the event of all major disasters. The Fire Marshal, Kurt Johnson, oversees the Fire Prevention Division and the Emergency Preparedness Division.

Education

Public
The city is served by the Montebello Unified School District. M.U.S.D. serves the city of Montebello, portions of the cities of Bell Gardens, Commerce, Downey, Rosemead, Pico Rivera, and Monterey Park, as well as the unincorporated community of South San Gabriel, and a part of the unincorporated community of East Los Angeles.  The District is one of the largest and most diverse in Los Angeles County with an enrollment of more than 35,000 K–12 students and 30,000 adults enrolled in adult education.

There are eighteen elementary schools, six intermediate schools, five high schools, and four adult schools.  The five high schools are: Montebello High School, founded in 1909; Bell Gardens High School; Schurr High School; Vail High School, an alternative high school for grades 10–12;

Applied Technology Center, a $30 million facility opened in the fall of 2011, is a vocational high school with state-of-the-art technical training capable of accommodating up to 750 students.  Students wishing to attend ATC are required to apply for admission.  Board of education President Edwin Chau stated that ATC offers students a "rigorous academic curriculum and career technical education within a full-day schedule." Montebello Unified, has made it their goal to ensure students graduate ready and college prepared."  The project was paid for with a $98 million Measure M bond, which voters passed in November 2004.

Private
Saint Benedict School, a private parochial grammar school, K-8, is operated on Saint Benedict Church property. It opened in September 1941 and was formally dedicated on Pearl Harbor Day, December 7, 1941.

Our Lady of Miraculous Medal Parish School. The school first opened in 1954 through the leadership of the Daughters of Charity of St. Vincent De Paul.

A private parochial high school, Cantwell-Sacred Heart of Mary High School, is also located in Montebello. Originally two separate gender-segregated High Schools, they merged in the 1991, the Sacred Heart of Mary campus moving to the Cantwell campus.

St. John's Lutheran Church has a Kindergarten-8th school on a site adjoining the church.

Parks and recreation 
The Montebello Parks and Recreation Division provides recreational services for all age groups, from small children to the growing senior citizen community. Their Mission Statement is: "Creating Community Through People, Parks & Recreation".
 Grant Rea Park, is home to the Montebello Barnyard Zoo, Pony Rides, Train Rides and a miniature water park. Also home to the Montebello Batting Cages, 6 hitting cages, Hardball, fastpitch and Lob Softball machines www.MontebelloBattingCages.com.
 Bicknell Park, where the Montebello Genocide Memorial is located.
 The oldest park is Montebello City Park, 1300 W Whittier Blvd. which is now home to Montebello Skateboard Park located where, in the 1950s, were quiet fishponds. The skateboard park was opened in 2002. Montebello previously had a skatepark between Schurr High School and the Montebello Plaza shopping center.
 The Sanchez Adobe Park is home to the Juan Matias Sanchez Adobe, the oldest standing structure in the City of Montebello, built in 1845.
 Ashiya Park, named for Montebello's sister city in Japan. The park is separated into two sides that are divided by Beverly Boulevard.
 Henry Acuna Park, named in honor of the only Montebello Police Department Officer who lost his or her life while on duty. In Acuna's memory a Marker of Honor and Tree of Life were placed at the entrance of Acuna Park.
 Reggie Rodriguez Park is named for a Vietnam War hero and is an  area on which is located the Reggie Rodriguez Community Center, noted for its unique architecture and providing a central location for activities for the youth population in the city as well as a polling station during election periods.
 Chet Holifield Park is the city's southernmost park, and home to the Chet Holifield Branch Library. The name of the library and park honors Congressman Chet Holifield, 19th District (served 1943–1974).
 Potrero Heights Park is located at the northernmost point in Montebello, near the border with Rosemead.

Golf course
Montebello Municipal Golf Course's history dates back to 1928, when it was built as an enterprising country club designed by golf course architect Max Behr. The city purchased the course in 1941. The 120 acre, 18-hole public championship course was remodeled for the 1998-99 reopening, held on May 7, 1999. The remodel added 3 lakes, new greens, tees, bunkers and cart paths.  Montebello Country Club is now recognized as one of the best municipal golf courses in Southern California. Several hotels and the Quiet Cannon Conference & Event Center are located on the golf course campus. The conference center holds up to 1,000 people for various banquets and events.

Tree division
Montebello's municipal tree division is responsible for maintaining the city's trees located in the parkways, street medians, parks, and golf course. With an estimated total of 20,000 trees on city property, the tree division has been recognized by the National Arbor Day Foundation for the outstanding management of the city's urban forest and has been a continuous recipient of the "Tree City U.S.A." award since 1991.

Transportation
The city is easily accessible to the Long Beach- (I-710), San Gabriel River- (I-605), Pomona- (SR 60) and Santa Ana- (I-5) freeways.

Buses
Public transportation is provided by the city-owned Montebello Bus Lines; the service is the sixth largest public transit agency in Los Angeles County with an annual ridership of over 8.2 million.  Starting in 1931 with a fleet of four buses, the agency now has a fleet of 66 buses, including five hybrid gasoline-electric buses and serves 14 communities.

Other public transportation
Montebello LINK is a transportation shuttle offering curb-to-curb service to and from the Montebello/Commerce station.  Montebello also operates Montebello Dial-a-Taxi, a program offering transportation for senior residents and qualified disabled persons of any age.  15,000 residents utilize this service.

Notable people
 Alan Bannister, born in Montebello, was a Major League Baseball player
 Richard Cabral, American actor and writer known for his role on the anthology series American Crime (2015), and his recurring role on the Fox action comedy-drama TV series Lethal Weapon, based on the action film series of the same name
 Ken Davitian, actor, most notably played the role of Azamat in the movie "Borat"
 John DeCuir, Oscar-winning art director; Montebello High School Class of 1936; earned eleven Oscar nominations, winning three: The King and I, Cleopatra, and Hello, Dolly!
Oscar De La Hoya, 10-time boxing world champion and Olympic gold medalist
 Rodney Eastman, actor, A Nightmare on Elm Street 3: Dream Warriors and A Nightmare on Elm Street 4: The Dream Master; graduate of Schurr High School Class of 1985
 Deborah Foreman, actress, star of film Valley Girl as Julie Richman; born in Montebello
 Darlene Hard, tennis player, 2-time U.S. Nationals champion (1960, 1961), 1960 French champion, Fed Cup champ 1963; won 18 tennis titles in doubles and mixed doubles; born in Montebello and a 1953 graduate of Montebello High School
 Ed Hernandez, California state senator and former state assembly member
 Jay Hernandez, actor, has appeared in several major motion pictures, including playing the lead role in the 2005 horror film Hostel and Chato Santana / El Diablo in 2016's Suicide Squad
 Bobby Knoop, Major League Baseball player and coach, member Los Angeles Angels Hall of Fame; Montebello High School Class of 1956
 Mickey Klutts, Major League Baseball player, was born in Montebello
 Jack Larson, Actor, co-star in the Adventures of Superman (Jimmy Olsen), graduated from Montebello High School
 Judi Evans Luciano, actress, was born in Montebello, star on Days of Our Lives
 Robert Bruce Merrifield, Montebello High School class of 1939, Nobel Prize winner
 Max Montoya, born in Montebello, NFL player, 4-time Pro Bowl selection
 Sergio Mora, professional boxer; Schurr High School class of 1997
 Sona Movsesian, born in Montebello, executive assistant, author and media personality
 Mirai Nagasu, born in Montebello, professional figure skater, national champion and Olympian
 Edward James Olmos, actor and director; Montebello High School Class of 1964
 Ramona Pagel, athlete, held U.S. record in shot put, Pan-American Games gold medalist; Schurr High School
 Joshua Pérez, born in Montebello, professional soccer player
 Jeffrey Lee Pierce, born in Montebello, singer, songwriter, guitarist and author. Founding member and frontman of The Gun Club.
 Jerry Pimm,  college basketball coach, Montebello High School Class of 1956
 Carl Renezeder, off-road racing champion
 Jack Russell, born in Montebello, lead vocalist for Great White
 Mark Salas, born in Montebello, former MLB player.
 Hagop Sandaldjian, microminiature sculptor, lived and worked in Montebello after emigrating from Yerevan, Armenia (then part of the Soviet Union) in 1980.
 Catherine Sandoval, first Latina Rhodes Scholar, professor of law, California Public Utilities Commissioner
 Tom Tellez, track star and coach; Montebello High School Class of 1951, Tom Tellez Track at Carl Lewis International Complex
 Nosaj Thing , hip-hop recording artist,  is a native of Montebello
 Art Torres, politician, Montebello High School Class of 1964
 Michael Trevino, born in Montebello; actor, best known for his role in "The Vampire Diaries" as Tyler Lockwood
 Eduardo Xol, television personality; graduate of Schurr High School Class of 1984

Twin towns – sister cities
 Ashiya, Hyōgo Prefecture, Japan
The City of Montebello has been affiliated with the City of Ashiya, Japan since the inception of the Sister City Program in 1961. Student Ambassadors are chosen to travel to Ashiya every year.
  Stepanakert, Nagorno-Karabakh Republic
The City of Montebello has been affiliated with the City of Stepanakert, the capital of the unrecognized Nagorno-Karabakh Republic, since 2005, when a much controversial move to facilitate the sister city relationship was made by the Armenian National Committee of the San Gabriel Valley and unanimously approved by the City Council.

See also

List of cities in Los Angeles County, California
List of municipalities in California

References

External links

 
Armenian-American culture in California
Armenian diaspora communities in the United States
1920 establishments in California
Cities in Los Angeles County, California
Communities in the San Gabriel Valley
Gateway Cities
Incorporated cities and towns in California
Mid-importance Southern California articles
Populated places established in 1920
Chicano and Mexican neighborhoods in California